The 2019 UNAF U-15 Tournament is the 4th edition of the UNAF U-15 Tournament. The tournament took place in Oran, Algeria from 18 to 25 March 2019. Four teams take place to the tournament, Algeria, Libya, Morocco and the invited team Mauritania. Egypt and Tunisia withdrew from the tournament.

Participants
 

 

Withrawed teams

Venues

Match officials

Referees
 Abdelali Ibrir (Algeria) 
 Mohamed Ahmed Abbas Qabeel (Egypt) 
 Abdel Hamid Qchaira (Libya) 
 Yassine Boussalim (Morocco)  
 Houssam Boularas (Tunisia) 

Assistant Referees
 Djamel Eddine Bourchou (Algeria)
 Abdelkader Slimani (Algeria)
 Shehab Sayed Saleh Rashed (Egypt)
 Essam Al-Tarhouni (Libya)
 Abdel Qadus Al-Maghrebi (Libya)
 Amine Dahane (Morocco)
 Idris Aït Jilal (Morocco)
 Mohamed Salim Jabaniani (Tunisia)

Squads

Tournament

Goalscorers
2 goals

 Malek Mohamed Abdelaziz
 Youcef Chourouk
 Omar Seddik

1 goal

 Mohamed Islam Benmechta
 Abdelghani Lalem
 Adem Harfouche
 Younes Laid
 Mohamed Rafik Omar
 Ali Abdel Salam
 Abdel Maysar Bouchiba
 Yusef Faraj
 Hassan Akboub
 Saad Chamal
 Salem Chaouma
 Oussama Dali
 Amine El Sabbah
 Yacine Khalifi
 Taha Redouane

References

External links
وهران تستضيف دورة اتحاد شمال افريقيا تحت 15 عاما - UNAF official website

2019 in African football
2019
2019